Boolarra is a closed station located in the town of Boolarra, on the Mirboo North railway line railway line in Victoria, Australia. 

Disused railway stations in Victoria (Australia)
Transport in Gippsland (region)
City of Latrobe